Tim Häußler (born 21 July 1997) is a German football full-back who plays for VSG Altglienicke.

Club career 
Häußler began playing football in Hertha BSC in his native city Berlin and moved to Energie Cottbus U-17 in the summer of 2012. He made his professional debut in the 3. Liga on 2 May 2015 against SpVgg Unterhaching.
He played 46 minutes of the game, before he was replaced by Jonas Zickert. He has played 2 games for Energie Cottbus since 2015.

International career 
He has played 1 game for Germany U-18.

Career statistics

References

External links
 

1997 births
Living people
Association football defenders
German footballers
FC Energie Cottbus players
FC Bayern Munich II players
FSV Wacker 90 Nordhausen players
FSV Union Fürstenwalde players
3. Liga players
Regionalliga players
Germany youth international footballers
Footballers from Berlin